Pasi is a Finnish masculine given name. Notable people with this name include:

Pasi Arvonen (born 1968), Finnish ice hockey coach
Pasi Hirvonen (born 1988), Finnish ice hockey defenceman
Pasi Jaakonsaari (born 1959), Finnish footballer
Pasi Siitonen (born 1978), Finnish singer, better known as Stig
Pasi Välimäki (born 1965), Finnish general

References

Finnish masculine given names